Weightlifting was contested from December 12 to December 18 at the 1966 Asian Games in Cultural Hall, Bangkok, Thailand. The competition included only men's events for eight different weight categories. Iran finished 1st at the medal table by winning three gold medals.

Medalists

Medal table

References
 Results

External links
 Weightlifting Database

 
1966 Asian Games events
1966
Asian Games
Asian